Curtis Anthony Anderson (born May 29, 1940) is a contemporary American philosopher, currently Professor of Philosophy at the University of California at Santa Barbara. He earned his Ph.D. in philosophy from University of California at Los Angeles in 1977, where he worked closely with the renowned logician Alonzo Church.  He also holds an M.S. in mathematics from the University of Houston (1965), where he earned his undergraduate degree in physics and mathematics (1964).

Anderson's work over the years has focused primarily in the philosophy of logic and the philosophy of language, although he also works in such areas as the philosophy of religion and has an interest in most areas of traditional philosophy.

Prior to his professorship at U.C. Santa Barbara, Dr. Anderson held posts notably at the University of Minnesota at Minneapolis, and the University of Texas at Austin.

Publications
The Paradox of the Knower, 1983.
Divine Omnipotence and Impossible Tasks: An Intensional Analysis, 1984.
Some Difficulties Concerning Russellian Intensional Logic, 1986.
Bealer's Quality and Concept, 1987.
Propositional Attitudes: The Role of Content in Logic, Language, and Mind, 1990.
Analyzing Analysis, 1993.

See also
American philosophy
List of American philosophers

External links
C.A. Anderson's faculty page at UCSB

1940 births
Living people
Philosophers from California
Philosophers from Minnesota
Philosophers from Texas
University of Houston alumni
University of California, Los Angeles alumni
University of Minnesota faculty
University of Texas at Austin faculty
University of California, Santa Barbara faculty
Christian philosophers